The Strokes received several nominations in their debut year in 2002, including Best New Act from the MTV Europe Music Awards and Best Live Act from the Q Awards. They won several awards in the same year, including Best International Band from the BRIT Awards, and Band of the Year and Best New Act from the NME Awards. They have also been nominated for Best International Band at the NME Awards in 2003, 2006 (which they won), 2007, and 2016. In 2021, the band won the Grammy Award for Best Rock Album, making it their first Grammy Award win. Overall, the Strokes have received seven awards from 22 nominations.

Awards and nominations
ASCAP College Vanguard Award 
"In recognition of the impact of new and developing musical genres which help shape the future of American music and which gain early popularity on college radio, ASCAP is proud to present the 2002 ASCAP College Vanguard Award to RCA/BMG recording artists the Strokes, whose debut album, Is This It, has achieved substantial commercial and critical acclaim in the U.S. and abroad. ASCAP is proud to honor these young pioneers and their songwriting achievements."

|-
| 2002 || Is This It || Best International Album || 

BRIT Awards
The BRIT Awards are the British Phonographic Industry's annual pop music awards. The Strokes have received one award.

|-
|rowspan="3"|  ||rowspan="2"| The Strokes || Best International Newcomer|| 
|-
| Best International Group|| 
|-
| Is This It || Best International Album|| 
|-
| 2004 || The Strokes || Best International Group || 

Danish Music Awards

!Ref.
|-
| 2002
| The Strokes
| Best International Newcomer
| 
|

Denmark GAFFA Awards
Delivered since 1991. The GAFFA Awards (Danish: GAFFA Prisen) are a Danish award that rewards popular music awarded by the magazine of the same name.

|-
| 2002
| rowspan=2|The Strokes
| Best Foreign New Act
| 
|-
| rowspan=2|2004
| Best Foreign Band
| 
|-
| "12:51"
| Best Foreign Hit
| 

Grammy Awards
The Grammy Awards are distributed by the Recording Academy to recognize achievements in the music industry. The Strokes have received one award.

|-
| 2021 || The New Abnormal || Best Rock Album || 

Meteor Music Awards
The Meteor Music Awards are distributed by MCD Productions and are the national music awards of Ireland. The Strokes have received one award.

|-
| 2002 || Is This It || Best International Album || 

MTV Europe Music Awards
The MTV Europe Music Awards is an annual awards ceremony established in 1994 by MTV Europe. The Strokes have received three nominations.

|-
| 2002 || The Strokes || Best New Act || 
|-
| 2006 || The Strokes || Best Rock Band || 
|-
| 2011 || The Strokes || Best Alternative Band || 

MTV Video Music Awards
The MTV Video Music Awards is an annual awards ceremony established in 1984 by MTV. The Strokes have received one nomination.

|-
|  || "Last Nite" || MTV2 Award || 

MTV Video Music Brazil
Established in 1995, the MTV Video Music Brazil awards, commonly known as VMB, are MTV Brasil's annual award ceremony. Many award winners are chosen by MTV viewers.

!Ref.
|-
| 2002
| "Last Nite"
| rowspan=1|Best International Video
| 
| 
|-
| 2011
| The Strokes
| Best International Act
| 
| 

NME Awards
The NME Awards is an annual awards ceremony founded by the British music magazine NME. The Strokes have received four awards from ten nominations.

|-
|rowspan="4"| 2002 || Is This It || Best Album || 
|-
| "Hard to Explain" || Best Single || 
|-
|rowspan="2"| The Strokes || Band of the Year || 
|-
| Best New Act || 
|-
| 2003 || The Strokes || Best International Band || 
|-
| 2005 || The Strokes || Best International Band || 
|-
|rowspan="2"| 2006 || The Strokes || Best International Band || 
|-
| "Juicebox" || Best Video || 
|-
| 2007 || The Strokes || Best International Band || 
|-
| 2016 || The Strokes || Best International Band || 

Pollstar Concert Industry Awards
The Pollstar Concert Industry Awards is an annual award ceremony to honor artists and professionals in the concert industry.

!Ref.
|-
| 2002
| Tour
| Most Creative Stage Production
| 
| 

Q Awards
The Q Awards are hosted annually by the music magazine Q. The Strokes have received three nominations.

|-
| 2001 || The Strokes || Best New Act || 
|-
| 2002 || The Strokes || Best Live Act || 
|-
| 2011 || The Strokes || Greatest Act of the Last 25 Years || 

The Daily Californian Art Awards

!Ref.
|-
| 2020
| The New Abnormal
| Best Rock Album
| 
| 

UK Music Video Awards
The UK Music Video Awards is an annual celebration of the best in music video.

|-
| rowspan=2|2020 || "Bad Decisions" || rowspan=2|Best Rock Video - International || 
|-
| "Ode to the Mets" ||  

Žebřík Music Awards

!Ref.
|-
| 2001
| rowspan=2|The Strokes
| rowspan=2|Best International Surprise
| 
| rowspan=4|
|-
| 2002
| 
|-
| rowspan=3|2003
| Room on Fire
| Best International Album
| 
|-
| "12:51"
| Best International Song
|

References

External links
The Strokes official website

Strokes
Awards And Nominations